The Shire of Buloke is a local government area in Victoria, Australia, located in the western part of the state. It includes the towns of Birchip, Charlton, Donald, Sea Lake and Wycheproof. It was formed in 1995 from the amalgamation of the Shire of Wycheproof, Shire of Birchip, Shire of Charlton, Shire of Donald, and parts of the Shire of Kara Kara.

The Shire is governed and administered by the Buloke Shire Council; its seat of local government and administrative centre is located at the Council headquarters in Wycheproof, it also has service centres located in Birchip, Charlton, Donald and Sea Lake. The Shire is named after a major geographical feature in the region, Lake Buloke, which is located in the south of the LGA; the name also comes from the "buloke" or "bulloak" tree Allocasuarina luehmannii, which is common in the region.

Within the Shire, agriculture, particularly grain production, is the predominant source of income and employment.

Council

Current composition
The Council is composed of three wards and seven Councillors, with three Councillors elected to represent the Mount Jeffcott Ward and two Councillors per remaining ward elected to represent each of the other wards.

Administration and governance
The council meets in the council chambers at the council headquarters in the Wycheproof Municipal Offices, which is also the location of the council's administrative activities. It also provides customer services at its administrative centre in Wycheproof.

Townships and localities
The 2021 census, the shire had a population of 6,178 down from 6,201 in the 2016 census

^ - Territory divided with another LGA
* - Not noted in 2016 Census
# - Not noted in 2021 Census

Traditional owners 
The traditional owners of this area are the Wotjobaluk, Jaadwa, Jadawadjali, Wergaia and Jupagalk and Dja Dja Wurrung.

See also
 List of places on the Victorian Heritage Register in the Shire of Buloke

References

External links
 Buloke Shire Council official website
 Metlink local public transport map
 Link to Land Victoria interactive maps

Local government areas of Victoria (Australia)
Loddon Mallee (region)
 
Mallee (Victoria)
North Central Victoria